Ekspress-A2 ( meaning Express-A2), also designated Ekspress-6A No 2 and sometimes erroneously called Ekspress-2A, is a Russian communications satellite which is operated by Russian Satellite Communications Company (RSCC). It was constructed by NPO PM and Alcatel Space and is based on the MSS-2500-GSO satellite bus.

Satellite 
The launch was contracted by Khrunichev State Research and Production Space Center, and used a Proton-K / Blok DM-2M launch vehicle flying from Site 200/39 at the Baikonur Cosmodrome.

Launch 
Ekspress-2A is a Russian geosynchronous communications spacecraft that was launched on 12 March 2000 from Baikonur by a Proton-K launch vehicle at 04:07:00 UTC. USSPACECOM had tentatively named it Express-6A. The  spacecraft carries 12 transponders in C-band and five in Ku-band to provide voice, data, and video communications in Russia from the parked longitude of 80° east, supplementing the existing fleet of seven Gorizont, two Ekspress and an EKRAN-M. Ekspress are scheduled to replace the aging Gorizont fleet.

Mission 
It is part of the Ekspress network of satellites. Following its launch and on-orbit testing, it was placed in geostationary orbit at 103° East, from where it provides communications services to Russia. It is equipped with seventeen transponders. In October 2015, the satellite was retired and moved to a graveyard orbit above the geostationary orbit.

References

External links

Ekspress satellites
Spacecraft launched in 2000
Satellites using the KAUR bus